Cloghanboy West is a townland in Athlone, County Westmeath, Ireland. The townland is in the civil parish of St. Mary's.

The townland stands near the centre of the town, with the Dublin–Westport/Galway railway line running through the area, the Athlone railway station stands to the west, in the Athlone townland.

References 

Townlands of County Westmeath